The Sid-Mar is a historic apartment building located at Indianapolis, Indiana.  It was built in 1887, and is a three-story, triangular, Italianate style red brick building.  It has commercial storefronts on the first floor and segmental arched and projecting bay windows on the upper floors.

It was listed on the National Register of Historic Places in 1983.

References

Apartment buildings in Indiana
Residential buildings on the National Register of Historic Places in Indiana
Italianate architecture in Indiana
Residential buildings completed in 1887
Residential buildings in Indianapolis
National Register of Historic Places in Indianapolis
1887 establishments in Indiana